Harry Potter and the Half-Blood Prince (Original Motion Picture Soundtrack) is the soundtrack to the 2009 film of the same name, written and composed by Nicholas Hooper. The score was conducted by Hooper alongside Alastair King. It is the second Harry Potter film to be scored by Hooper, who also composed the score for the previous film in the series, Harry Potter and the Order of the Phoenix. The soundtrack was released on 14 July 2009, a day before the film's release, and was nominated for a Grammy Award for Best Score Soundtrack Album for a Motion Picture.

Marketing
On the Harry Potter website a preview of one of the tracks (Ginny Weasley) is played in the background.
On 17 June, a preview for three tracks was played in the background of film's updated official site. A 15-second audio preview for 13 tracks from the soundtrack was released on 19 June via Virgin Mobile's website. The soundtrack runs over 60 minutes in length.

On 30 June, AOL Radio previewed the whole soundtrack online.

Reception
On the Billboard issue dated 1 August 2009, the album debuted at number twenty-nine on the Billboard 200 chart, thus making it the highest charting soundtrack among all the six movie soundtracks released. The soundtrack also charted at three on the Top Soundtracks Chart.

Track listing

Not included on the soundtrack were "Friends and Love" (a compilation of "When Ginny Kissed Harry" and "Harry and Hermione" that came with purchasing a ticket for the movie on Fandango), "Big Beat Repeat" (heard in the Gryffindor common room after the Quidditch match) by Josh Powell, and a track that could be named "Murder & Escape" (the music that can be heard when Dumbledore falls from the Astronomy Tower and Harry pursues Snape).

Track details
The score for Half-Blood Prince was conducted by Hooper and Alastair King and performed by the Chamber Orchestra of London, the orchestra that performed the score for Order of the Phoenix, with orchestrations provided by King, Jeff Atmajian, Simon Whiteside, Daryl Griffith and Bradley Farmer. The score featured a more significant role for light choir. Thematically, Hooper referenced his own ideas from the previous score and several elements from Williams' work.

Hooper stated that "Placing John Williams' themes became obvious as we went along. The beginning of the film has to have at least a hint of 'Hedwig's Theme'."

"Opening": After a brief quotage of "Hedwig's Theme", in which Hooper lifts one note by semi-tone, elements of light choir are introduced. The use of Hooper's choral theme throughout the score is a reference to Dumbledore and the events that would entail, regarding his character and the climax of the film. A driving theme that reoccurs in "Into the Rushes" is used here to represent the Death Eaters and the havoc that they inflict in this sixth film. Hooper extends his use of percussion, with violent off-beat anvil that cuts through the repetitively propulsive, galvanic string figure.
"Ron's Victory": Hooper uses several variations on themes from Williams' piece "Quidditch, Third Year".
"Inferi in the Firestorm": Hooper utilises not only whirls of dissonant strings but also an orchestral sound that Williams used previously in Harry Potter and the Prisoner of Azkaban, particularly in the tracks "The Dementors Converge" and "Finale".
"Dumbledore's Farewell" is reused by Alexandre Desplat in the Harry Potter and the Deathly Hallows – Part 2 theme "Severus and Lily", which is used in the scene where Harry views Snape's memories in the Pensieve.

Awards

References

06
2009 soundtrack albums
2000s film soundtrack albums
Fantasy film soundtracks